"Band Geeks" is an episode of the American animated television series SpongeBob SquarePants. It is the second part of the 15th episode of the second season and the second half of the 35th episode overall. It originally aired on Nickelodeon in the United States on September7, 2001. It was written by C.H. Greenblatt, Aaron Springer, and Merriwether Williams, and the animation was directed by Frank Weiss. Springer served as director, and Greenblatt served as storyboard artist.

"Band Geeks" follows Squidward, who recruits the citizens of Bikini Bottom to play in a marching band for the Bubble Bowl. The episode received widespread acclaim, with many fans and critics considering it the best episode of the entire series. The episode won Best Sound Editing in Television – Animation at the 2002 Golden Reel Awards.

Plot

Squidward Tentacles gets a call from his wealthy former high school classmate and rival, Squilliam Fancyson, who has succeeded in everything in which Squidward has failed, including music. Squilliam reveals to Squidward that he has become the leader of a band scheduled to play at a venue called the Bubble Bowl, but he will be busy at that time and cannot attend. Squilliam derisively suggests that Squidward's band should substitute for his at the Bubble Bowl, correctly believing that Squidward does not have one. However, Squidward insists that he has a band and accepts the challenge. He assembles a large marching band composed of various Bikini Bottom residents.

During their one week of training, the band performs consistently poorly and fails to improve at all. On the last day of practice, the band members start insulting and blaming each other for their poor performance, causing a huge, chaotic brawl. As band class ends, the band members calm down and start filing out of the building. Before they leave, Squidward appears outside, who despondently tells them to not perform, and goes home in distraught over his failure. However, SpongeBob convinces the other band members to go through with the performance for Squidward's sake, and he takes command of their training.

On the day of the concert, Squilliam shows up at the venue entrance, where Squidward claims that his band "died in a marching accident". The band then immediately arrives, and Squidward reluctantly proceeds with the performance. They enter the Bubble Bowl, a large glass dome that elevates them into a live-action football stadium full of human fans. To Squidward's surprise, the band is tremendously successful, playing "Sweet Victory" for the crowd. Squilliam enters a state of shock and faints, leaving Squidward to happily conduct the band and celebrate.

Production
"Band Geeks" was directed by Aaron Springer, and was written by Springer, C. H. Greenblatt, and Merriwether Williams. Frank Weiss served as animation director, and Greenblatt worked as storyboard artist. The writers started to work for "Band Geeks" with the idea of a rival. Williams said, "We always wanted to do a rival show, and I think we tried to do a rival show for SpongeBob, and it wasn't working. So we came up with the idea of a rival for Squidward and, in some ways it's Squidward's story, and SpongeBob and Patrick are just kind of around." The idea of having a band was unspecified. Williams remarked, "I forget who was in band. I was not in a band, but I think maybe Doug Lawrence was in a band. I think Steve Hillenburg was in a band, too."

The music used in the segment of the episode where Squidward's marching band is playing while coming down the street was from Nick Carr, the series' music editor. He found a piece of marching band music that was a band intentionally playing poorly, but sound designer Jeff Hutchins said, "You could still discern the tune." Hutchins thought, "Well, let's take this one step further. What if they couldn't even play their instruments, let alone a tune?" He brought his portable DAT recorder to a musical instrument retail store and met two men who worked on its loading dock, packaging and shipping the instruments. Hutchins made the two men play most of the instruments terribly. He said, "I got these two guys to squeak, blast, and squawk on most of the instruments they sold."

Upon returning to the studio with the sound effects, he built a marching band, one instrument at a time. Hutchins said, "They weren't in any key and had no rhythm whatsoever. When you heard it, you just had to say 'Ouch!'" Hutchins played the sound effects for series creator Hillenburg for review. Hillenburg rejected it, saying "it was too far over the edge." Hutchins said, "a lot of effort for something that lasts only 15 seconds on screen. In this case, the whole thing never made it on the air."

When storyboard artist Greenblatt, with the writers, was storyboarding "Band Geeks", they thought of "a big number" at the end, where everyone would rally together for Squidward. Greenblatt said, "The story outline called for making it a really great marching band sequence, and it usually helps to have the music ahead of time to board to, so we started searching around." The writers were able to find music, as Nickelodeon has a library of royalty-free music. The writers listened to various marching band tunes. However, Greenblatt said, "The more we heard, it didn't seem terribly funny that the finale was just them playing marching band music well."

However, David Glen Eisley's song "Sweet Victory" stood out from the other tracks in the library. Greenblatt said, "It was different than what we were looking for, but it was so amazing that we knew we had to use it. So we boarded the sequence to the music, and it felt like such a better ending than any song we could have written on our own." The writers gave it a freeze-frame shot for the ending. Greenblatt's favorite part was director Springer's drawings of Patrick on the electric drums and SpongeBob saying, "It's the thrill of one more kill" (an excerpt from "Sweet Victory"). The live action Bubble Bowl crowd is a combination of footage from a United States Football League game featuring the Memphis Showboats and the Tampa Bay Bandits on June 16, 1984, and footage shot specifically for the episode.

Release
"Band Geeks" originally aired on Nickelodeon in the United States on September 7, 2001, with a TV-Y parental rating. It was released on the DVD compilation titled SpongeBob SquarePants: Halloween on August 27, 2002, and on SpongeBob SquarePants: Home Sweet Pineapple that was released on January 4, 2005. The episode was also included in SpongeBob SquarePants: The Complete 2nd Season DVD released on October 19, 2004. On September 22, 2009, "Band Geeks" was released on the SpongeBob SquarePants: The First 100 Episodes DVD, alongside all episodes of seasons one through five.

Reception
"Band Geeks" received widespread acclaim from both fans and critics. Upon release, the episode was awarded and honored at the 2002 Golden Reel Awards for Best Sound Editing in Television – Animation category. Tom Kenny, SpongeBob's voice actor, considers "Band Geeks" one of his favorite episodes. In a 2009 review, Michael Cavna of The Washington Post ranked the episode at  5 in his "The Top Five SpongeBob Episodes: We Pick 'Em" list. He said "Squidward's mix of artistic aspiration in the face of goading, humiliation and unrelenting sub-mediocrity made this a kids' episode that adults can experience on a whole 'nother level." The Guardian ranked "Band Geeks" the second-best episode of the show, next to "Krusty Krab Training Video". Jordan Moreau, Katcy Stephan and David Viramontes of Variety ranked it the best SpongeBob episode. They praised the Bubble Bowl performance and said that the episode "builds toward that moment through an episode packed to the gills with visual gag after visual gag".

Nancy Basile of About.com ranked "Band Geeks" at  1 in her "Best SpongeBob SquarePants Episodes" list, writing "[The episode] has so many of the best elements of SpongeBob, crafted into a story whose rhythm flows smoothly and quickly to reach a poignant end." She praised the entire premise, calling it "funny just to think about." Basile also lauded the ending "complete with a keytar and freeze-frame jump in the air." Emily Estep of WeGotThisCovered.com ranked the episode as the fourth-best SpongeBob SquarePants episode, explaining that "most of the gags in 'Band Geeks' center around Squidward's bleak existence, but it's also stuffed with one-liners from and about each of the characters on the show, such as the line 'These claws ain't just for attractin' mates!' from an about-to-brawl Mr. Krabs, and when Squidward says, 'No, Patrick, mayonnaise is not an instrument,' in response to an inevitable query from the stupid star."

"Band Geeks" was one of the top episodes as chosen by viewers at Nick.com in the event "The Best Day Ever Marathon" held in 2006. In November 2007, as part of the "Top 100 Greatest Moments in Nicktoons History" during "Superstuff Nicktoons Weekend", it was ranked as the  1 greatest moment of all time. In 2012, Nickelodeon in the United Kingdom launched an event called "SpongeBob's Top 100", where viewers can vote at Nick.co.uk for their favorite episode. With over 160,000 votes cast, "Band Geeks" emerged as the winner. As of August 2022, it, alongside sister segment "The Secret Box", hold the highest rating and thus the  1 position for SpongeBob episodes on the series' IMDb page.

Impact
The featured song "Sweet Victory" was later released on the series soundtrack album SpongeBob SquarePants: The Yellow Album on November 15, 2005. "Sweet Victory" went from being a largely unknown production music track, to selling 300,000 iTunes downloads in one year after its exposure on the show.

However, the closed captioning provided for the episode incorrectly stated the song's lyrics, which led to many mid-2000s lyric websites having incorrect lyrics for the song. Specifically, a line that was stated as "the world is ours to follow" (the real lyrics are "and the one who's last to fall").  This led APM Music to create a typed lyrics sheet, referencing SpongeBob SquarePants which skyrocketed the song to popularity.

After the death of series creator Stephen Hillenburg on November 26, 2018, a Change.org petition was created which requested that the NFL pay tribute to him by playing "Sweet Victory" during the halftime show for Super Bowl LIII. By January 11, 2019, the petition received over 1.1 million signatures. On December 12, 2018, Mercedes-Benz Stadium, the host stadium for Super Bowl LIII, posted a scene from the episode on their official Twitter account, hinting at a possible success from the petition's efforts. On January 13, the headlining act, Maroon 5, also released a teaser video featuring a clip of SpongeBob, which furthered speculation.

During the halftime show on February 3, a short clip of Squidward and a snippet of the Bubble Bowl performance scene were used to announce guest singer Travis Scott, who Squidward described as "a true musical genius who needs no introduction." Many social media users were critical of the failure to include the "Sweet Victory" song and found the brief animated segment to be an inadequate tribute to Hillenburg. CBS News reported that the response by SpongeBob fans was mixed and noted the positive response from the animated show's official Twitter account. Despite the show's mixed reception, on-demand streams of "Sweet Victory" increased 566% after the Super Bowl, going up from 46,000 streams on February 1–2 to 310,000 on February 3–4. This led the track to enter Billboard's United States Hot Rock Songs chart at number 23 and the Kid Digital Song Sales chart at number two, just under Pinkfong's "Baby Shark." The day after the game, the Dallas Stars' Twitter page uploaded a modified version of the full "Sweet Victory" sequence, in which the band's uniforms were altered from red to green to match the Stars' colors, with the title "The #SuperBowl halftime show fans deserve". The Stars' video had previously been shown during their February 1 game against the Minnesota Wild.

During the SpongeBob SportsPants Countdown Special, before the NFL on Nickelodeon Wild Card matchup between the Chicago Bears against the New Orleans Saints, the "Sweet Victory" sequence was #1 on the countdown. Several NFL stars appear during the sequence. In February 2021, the clip of SpongeBob performing the song from the episode was featured in the Super Bowl LV commercial to promote ViacomCBS' launch of the Paramount+ streaming service, as various characters from the ViacomCBS profolio reached the summit of Paramount Mountain. The commercial and its usage of the song received a positive reception, with many believing the inclusion of the song was done to make up for the failure to include it in the halftime show two years earlier.

Footnotes

References

External links

2001 American television episodes
SpongeBob SquarePants episodes
Television episodes with live action and animation